The Cook-Johnson House is a historic house located at 3091 Franklin Avenue north of Salem, Iowa.

Description and history 
This two-story, brick Greek Revival style house was built in about 1850 by either Jonathan Cook or Henry W. Johnson. Both men were among the early Quaker settlers in this area. Johnson grew wealthy, in part, from his dealings with counterfeit money. Although the extent of his activities were not known until after his death, he was forced out of the local Quaker congregation because of it. Wallace Godfrey and Clark Osburn were also involved in the counterfeiting enterprise. In 1911, it was discovered that Osburn had killed Warner Davis who had learned of the illegal activity and was going to report it.

The house was listed on the National Register of Historic Places on October 28, 2010.

References

Houses completed in 1850
Greek Revival architecture in Iowa
Houses in Henry County, Iowa
National Register of Historic Places in Henry County, Iowa
Houses on the National Register of Historic Places in Iowa